Marshe may refer to:

 John Marshe, a Member of Parliament numerous times in the 16th century - see City of London (elections to the Parliament of England)
 Marshe Rockett (born 1985), American professional wrestler
 Surrey Marshe (born 1947), Playboy Playmate of the Month for January 1967
 Witham Marshe, the representative of the colony of Maryland at the negotiation of the Treaty of Lancaster in 1744
 Sheena Marshe, actress active from 1956–1968